O Eume is a comarca in the province of A Coruña, Galicia, Spain. Its capital is the municipality of Pontedeume. It contains five municipalities and 24,629 inhabitants in an area of 538.7 km2.

Municipalities

The five municipalities within the comarca are as follows, listed below with their areas and populations:

See also
 Comarcas of Spain
 Galicia (Spain)

References

O Eume